Tit is a village in the commune of Tamanrasset, in Tamanrasset District, Tamanrasset Province, Algeria. It is known for the battle of Tit which took place in May 1902 between the French colonial empire and the Kel Ahaggar.

References

Neighbouring towns and cities

Populated places in Tamanrasset Province